Tragocephala  is a genus of flat-faced longhorn beetles belonging to the family Cerambycidae.

Species
 Tragocephala alluaudi Lameere, 1893
 Tragocephala angolensis Aurivillius, 1916
 Tragocephala berchmansi Hintz, 1909
 Tragocephala burgeoni Breuning, 1938
 Tragocephala caerulescens Jordan, 1894
 Tragocephala carbonaria Lameere, 1892
 Tragocephala castelnaudi Thomson, 1868
 Tragocephala castnia Thomson, 1857
 Tragocephala crassicornis Jordan, 1903
 Tragocephala cuneifera Aurivillius, 1914
 Tragocephala descarpentriesi Lepesme & Breuning, 1950
 Tragocephala ducalis White, 1856
 Tragocephala formosa (Olivier, 1792)
 Tragocephala freyi  Brancsik, 1893
 Tragocephala gorilla Thomson, 1857
 Tragocephala gracillima Breuning, 1934
 Tragocephala grandis Jordan, 1903
 Tragocephala guerinii White, 1856
 Tragocephala jucunda (Gory, 1835)
 Tragocephala mima Thomson, 1878
 Tragocephala mniszechii Thomson, 1857
 Tragocephala morio Jordan, 1903
 Tragocephala nigroapicalis Breuning, 1938
 Tragocephala nobilis (Fabricius, 1787)
 Tragocephala phidias Jordan, 1894
 Tragocephala pretiosa Hintz, 1909
 Tragocephala pulchra (Waterhouse, 1880)
 Tragocephala suturalis Jordan, 1903
 Tragocephala tournieri Lepesme & Breuning, 1950
 Tragocephala univittipennis Breuning, 1974
 Tragocephala variegata Bertoloni, 1849
 Tragocephala viridipes Breuning, 1947

References 

 Biolib
  Worldwide Cerambycoidea Photo Gallery

 
Tragocephalini
Cerambycidae genera